Vishnu Temple is a  summit located in the Grand Canyon, in Coconino County of Arizona, US.

Description
Vishnu Temple is situated two miles south-southeast of the Cape Royal overlook on the canyon's North Rim, 1.5 mile south of Freya Castle, and two miles east-southeast of Wotans Throne, its nearest higher neighbor. According to the Köppen climate classification system, Vishnu Temple is located in a cold semi-arid climate zone. According to explorer Frederick Samuel Dellenbaugh, Vishnu Temple is "without doubt the most stupendous mass of nature's carving in the known world."

History
Vishnu Temple is named for Vishnu, the Hindu deity, redeemer of the universe. This toponym was applied in 1880 by Clarence Dutton who thought this mountain resembled an oriental pagoda, when he began the tradition of naming geographical features in the Grand Canyon after mythological deities. This geographical feature's name was officially adopted in 1906 by the U.S. Board on Geographic Names. The first ascent of the summit was made by Merrel Clubb and his son on July 13, 1945.

Geology

The summit of Vishnu Temple is composed of cream-colored, cliff-forming, Permian Coconino Sandstone with a Kaibab Limestone cupola caprock. The sandstone, which is the third-youngest of the strata in the Grand Canyon, was deposited 265 million years ago as sand dunes. Below the Coconino Sandstone is slope-forming, Permian Hermit Formation, which in turn overlays the Pennsylvanian-Permian Supai Group. Further down are strata of Mississippian Redwall Limestone, Cambrian Tonto Group, and finally Proterozoic Unkar Group at creek level. Precipitation runoff from Vishnu Temple drains south into the Colorado River via Vishnu Creek on its west side, and Unkar Creek on the east side.

Gallery

See also
 Geology of the Grand Canyon area
 Rama Shrine

References

External links 

 Weather forecast: National Weather Service
 Weather: Vishnu Temple
 Vishnu Temple aerial video: National Park Service

Grand Canyon
Landforms of Coconino County, Arizona
Mountains of Arizona
Mountains of Coconino County, Arizona
North American 2000 m summits
Colorado Plateau
Grand Canyon National Park
Sandstone formations of the United States